JWH-363 (1-Naphthyl{1-pentyl-5-[3-(trifluoromethyl)phenyl]-1H-pyrrol-3-yl}methanone) is a synthetic cannabinoid from the naphthoylpyrrole family which acts as an agonist of the CB1 (Ki = 245 ± 5nM) and CB2 (Ki = 71 ± 1nM) receptors, with a moderate (~3.45x) selectivity for the latter. JWH-363 was first synthesized in 2006 by John W. Huffman and colleagues to examine the nature of ligand binding to the CB1 receptor.

Legality
In the United States JWH-363 is not federally scheduled, although some states have passed legislation banning the sale, possession, and manufacture of JWH-363.

In Canada, JWH-363 and other naphthoylpyrrole-based cannabinoids are Schedule II controlled substances under the Controlled Drugs and Substances Act.

In the United Kingdom, JWH-363 and other naphthoylpyrrole-based cannabinoids are considered Class B drugs under the Misuse of Drugs Act 1971.

See also
List of JWH cannabinoids
Synthetic cannabinoid

References 

JWH cannabinoids
CB1 receptor agonists
CB2 receptor agonists
Designer drugs
Naphthoylpyrroles